Secret Nation is a 1992 political thriller written by Edward Riche, directed by Mike Jones and starring Cathy Jones.

The film tells the story of Frieda Vokey, a graduate history student working to complete her history thesis on confederation. She returns to her home in Newfoundland to investigate evidence that Newfoundland’s 1949 entry into Canada was a conspiracy. Following the death of a politician, whose papers contain evidence, she begins to believe that the referendum results were faked, with British spies helping the cause.

Secret Nation was produced for nearly $2 million by the National Film Board of Canada, with $1.8 million provided by First Choice and the CBC. The film was invited to New York City’s Museum of Modern Art, and screened as part of the This Film is From Canada Series.

Plot 

The film opens with the death of the elderly and wealthy Leo Cryptus (Denys Ferry), the Chief Returning Officer for the 1948 Newfoundland referendums on whetherh to return to responsible government, become a province of Canada, or remain under direct rule from London. The film then shifts to Montreal, introducing Frieda Vokey, a graduate student of McGill University completing her doctoral thesis on Newfoundland's 1949 entry into confederation titled “the decline of the sovereign Newfoundland state”. After academic advisors in Montreal ask if her thesis is "some kind of 'Newfie' joke?" because they don't understand it, she returns to her hometown of St. John’s, Newfoundland to conduct primary research on the topic.

Frieda is greeted by her mother, Oona (Mary Walsh), with whom she strikes up a womanly conversation. Upon arrival to her home, Frieda is welcomed by her brother Chris (Rick Mercer) and Frieda begins a heated discussion with her father, Lester, a private advisor to Premier Valentine Aylward (Andy Jones) about seeing Joey Smallwood (Kevin Noble) before his death.

While paying her respects for the Cryptus family, Frieda is introduced to Michael Cryptus (Géza Kovács), son of Leo Cryptus. Frieda is then warned by Dr. Furey (Brian Hennessey) that Newfoundland is not the best place to study Newfoundland history because the people here are still very involved with Newfoundland history.

Frieda intends on meeting a local Newfoundland journalist, Daniel Maddox (Ron Hynes), about discussing her thesis. Upon this meeting, Dan suggests that Frieda come to his home for dinner and further discussion. Following dinner, Frieda and Dan have an intimate encounter, after which, while he is sleeping, she sneaks into his office. She finds classified information regarding records of cheques sent to the British that were declined, and also letters sent to Dan declining his request for more information about the apparent conspiracy surrounding Newfoundland’s joining of confederation. Dan then awakens to find Frieda has left his home, and that his belongings have been searched. Both Frieda and Dan are later involved in an interview over the radio, in which Frieda discusses her findings discovered in Dan’s office. Frieda continues her investigation, after the interview, meeting with Michael, believing he has the information she is looking for regarding his father and the confederation conspiracy. Michael informs Frieda he knows nothing of this and becomes worried that his father was a political monster.

Frieda’s father later decides to help bringing her to an archive containing information on confederation. Frieda questions her father about British spies who helped the apparent scam. Her father states that he has no knowledge on that situation. Frieda then meets with Mr. Joey Smallwood at the hospital, she extensively questions him but he is not willing to speak to her because of his illness.

While attending a benefit banquet, Chris overhears Michael tell Frieda that two British gentlemen will be taking his father's papers to London the next day. He then steals the keys to the legislative assembly building from Doris' handbag and gives them to her. Frieda leaves the benefit dance, goes to the assembly building and quickly locates the secret files she was hoping to find. She also finds the stubs of cheques issued to her father, Lester, in 1949 - apparently to keep him silent about the true outcome of the second referendum. The two British men Michael mentioned arrive and enter the building over the objection of the security guard. Doris (Mary Lewis) and Dan arrive at the building to find out what's going on. Doris tells the men the Public Records Office will get the papers in due course but they are currently her responsibility. The men claim they are worried the papers may have been tampered with. Doris tells them that is ridiculous but she and Dan are quickly restrained when she picks up the phone to call the police. She is shown a badge by one of the men and says to Dan, "They not from the Public Records Office."  The four of them then begin to search the building.

Frieda hears the footsteps and quickly packs up some papers to take with her while leaving the rest, as the lights on the floor come on. She encounters Dan as she quietly negotiates her way through the stacks but he does not betray her, instead directing her to an escape route.  Frieda then meets Premier Aylward in a taxi outside and shows him the files. He looks at them, puts them back into the envelope, returns them and says, "Don't lose it!" Meanwhile, back at the legislative archive, Doris, Dan and the two British gentlemen find the papers Frieda had been looking at, all back together again. "These papers haven't been tampered with!" she says, but then notices that the elastic band on one accordion file has been undone (but says nothing about it).

Frieda confronts her father when she gets home, showing him the cheque stubs. He then shows her the cheques, which he never cashed. But he admits to conspiring in the deception over the result of the vote, because the people needed relief and he believed joining Canada was the best way to achieve economic stability for the former Dominion.

The next scene is dated December 28. The papers are announcing the death of Joey Smallwood, while the Vokey family are preparing to celebrate the completion of Frieda's thesis, A Secret Nation. This happy scene dissolves to a voice over of a letter written by Leo Cryptus August 12, 1948. He reveals to his friend, Douglas, that the vote was for responsible government not confederation with Canada. But the result was changed. He has the only proof - the original signed and sworn affidavit - which he cannot bring himself to destroy. Now, Frieda Vokey has it.

The final scene of the film shows two men taking a cartload of papers to an incinerator. It is the files from the 1948 referendum, and they are being destroyed. One of the men worries aloud that someone may have seen. Someone may know.  This scene dissolves to the closing theme, the camera shifting between various images, and finishing with audio recording from the 1948 debate in the Newfoundland House of Assembly, as the credits finish and there is silence.

Cast 

The cast of Secret Nation consisted of 40 cast members:
 
• Frieda Vokey (Cathy Jones) - A smart, young doctoral student living in Montreal, Quebec. Frieda teaches at McGill University decides to return home to Newfoundland to work on her history thesis, "The decline of the sovereign Newfoundland State". She looks at both the political and psychological process in which Newfoundland endured during confederation in 1949.

• Oona Vokey (Mary Walsh) - The mother of Frieda and Chris Vokey. Oona is a real estate agent who is very compassionate about her family.

• Chris Vokey (Rick Mercer) - Brother of Frieda and the son of Oona and Lester Vokey. Chris is a taxi dispatcher in St. John's and an aspiring Newfoundland artist.

• Lester Vokey (Michael Wade) - An evening telegram editor. He was also a private advisor to the premier. Lester was also an alcoholic.

• Dan Maddox (Ron Hynes) - A local Newfoundland journalist and history professor at Memorial University.

• Margie (Kay Anonsen) - A friend of Frieda and later a love interest of Chris.
 
• Michael Cryptus (Géza Kovács) - The son of Leo Cryptus.

• Leo Cryptus (Denys Ferry) - Chief returning officer for the 1948 confederation referendums. He is also a well-known Newfoundland lawyer.
 
• Doris (Mary Lewis) - The key holder for the secret archives of Newfoundland.

• Cecil Parkinson (Ken Campbell) - A British lawyer who works for the Smallwood family. His role was to keep the Smallwoods illness out of the eye of the public.
 
Remaining cast:

Brian Hennessey as Dr. Furey

John Doyle as Frieda's Thesis Advisor

Michael Chiasson as Montreal Professor

Kevin Noble as Joseph R. Smallwood

Richard Cashin as Peter

J. Cashin Peter Miller as Radio Interviewer

Michael Jones as Leo Cryptus (voice)

Andy Jones as Premier Aylward

Edward Riche as Reporter Ed Riche
 
Joey Smallwood as Joey Smallwood -Signs Confederation Agreement (archive footage) (uncredited) 
Louis St. Laurent as Louis St.Laurent - Signs Confederation Agreement (archive footage) (uncredited)

Production 

The film was produced by Paul Pope, with executive producer Don Haig.

The film was shot in Petty Harbour and St. John's, Newfoundland, Canada in the late Fall. Filming took just over 6 weeks. Production companies involved were Black Spot and Newfoundland Independent Filmmakers Co-Operative.

The cast and crew consisted of upwards of 80 people. They were very well taken care of. Members had comfortable facilities with regular catered breaks. The process was very well organized. Cast and crew members where easily transported to locations and all fees where a quick and easy system.

The cost of filming was nearly $2 million with $1.8 million coming from pre-sale provided by First Choice and CBC.

Awards and Achievements 

• At the 1992 Genie Awards, songwriter Ron Hynes won the category for Best Original Song for the song " The Final Breath" from the motion picture Secret Nation.
 
• Michael Jones took home a Special Achievement award for Secret Nation at the East Coast Music Awards in. The film featured many local artists such as Ron Hynes, Thomas Trio and the Red Albino and Jeff Johnston.

• Michael Jones was invited with his film, Secret Nation, to the very prestigious Museum of Modern Art in New York City. While there, he delivered speeches and sought out to find residents with Newfoundland background to invite them to the screening of the movie.

References 

 
1.Fitzgerald, John Edward. “Newfoundland Politics And Confederation Revisited: Three New    Works.” Newfoundland Studies Vol.9 No.1(1993): 109-114. Print.

2.John Perlin.  “More truth than fiction in Secret Nation?”  The Evening Telegram 18 Oct.1992:21.Print.

3.J.M. Sullivan. “Secret Nation: On Location.” The Sunday Telegram 18 Nov. 1990:22.Print.

4.“Secret Nation.” The Sunday Telegram . Nov.1990:Print.

5.“Secret Nation/delving into the past.”  The Express. Oct 28. 1992. Print

6. "Secret Nation Goes to the Big Apple." The Express. March 3. 1993. Print.

External links 
 Secret Nation at the (Internet Movie Database)

1992 films
Canadian thriller films
English-language Canadian films
Films set in Newfoundland and Labrador
Films shot in Newfoundland and Labrador
1992 thriller films
1990s Canadian films